Frederick Bernard Henry (born April 11, 1943) was the seventh Catholic Bishop of the diocese of Calgary, in the province of Alberta, Canada.

Biography
Henry was ordained to the priesthood on May 25, 1968. He holds an M.A. in Philosophy from the University of Notre Dame and a licentiate in theology from Gregorian University in Rome.  From 1973-1986 he served as associate professor of Theology and Philosophy at St. Peter's Seminary.  In 1986 he was appointed auxiliary bishop of London and titular bishop of Carinola, Italy.  In 1995 he was installed as the fifth bishop of Thunder Bay, Ontario, and on March 19, 1998 he was installed as the seventh bishop of Calgary. He was granted early retirement as Bishop of Calgary by Pope Francis on January 4, 2017, due to health concerns. He served as the Apostolic Administrator of the diocese until the installation of his successor, William McGrattan, on February 27, 2017.

Pastoral Assignments:

 1968 - 1970 Associate Pastor, Christ the King Parish, Windsor, ON. 
 1970 - 1973 Post Graduate Studies: University of Notre Dame, Notre Dame, Indiana - M.A. Philosophy. 
 Gregorian University, Rome, Italy - Licentiate in Theology. 
 1973 - 1986 Associate Professor of Theology and Philosophy at St. Peter's Seminary. 
 1973 - 1981 Group Spiritual Director, St. Peter's Seminary. 
 1981 - 1986 Rector of St. Peter's Seminary. 
 April 18, 1985 Named Honorary Prelate, with title, "Monsignor". 
 April 23, 1986 Appointed Auxiliary Bishop of London and Titular Bishop of Carinola, Italy. 
 June 24, 1986 Episcopal Ordination at St. Peter's Cathedral, London. 
 March 24, 1995 Named Bishop of Thunder Bay, ON. May 11, 1995 Installed as the fourth Bishop of Thunder Bay, ON. 
 January 16, 1998 Named Bishop of Calgary, AB. 
 March 19, 1998 Installed as the seventh Bishop of Calgary, AB.

Recent Appointments:

 Former Chairman of Episcopal Commission on Christian Education of the Canadian Conference of Catholic Bishops (CCCB) and member of the Management Committee for the National Office of Religious Education. 
 Canadian Delegate to 1990 Synod of Bishops - On the Formation of Priests in the Circumstances of the Present Day. 
 Former Liaison Bishop to the English-speaking Seminary Rectors (CCCB). 
 Liaison Bishop to Association of Catholic Colleges and Universities of Canada. 
 Representative of the Holy See for the Apostolic Visitation of Canadian Seminaries. 
 Member of the Executive Committee of the Ontario Conference of Catholic Bishops (OCCB). 
 Member of the OCCB Education Commission. Member of the OCCB Health/Medical Ethics Committee. 
 Member of the Board of Directors of the Catholic Health Association of Ontario. 
 Member of the Board of Directors of Catholic Church Extension Society. 
 Member of the Executive and National Council of Development and Peace (CCCB). 
 Chairman of the Social Affairs Commission (OCCB). 
 Member of the Board of Directors of Southdown.

Henry's staunch positions have made him a polarizing figure in the Calgary community.  His support has come from devout Catholics who agree with his traditional faith based views on contemporary issues such as gay marriage.  His behavior and command of the Calgary diocese has come with controversy.  Two recent examples were the banning schools and students from using casinos to fund-raise (the traditionally most significant source of extra revenue) and suggesting that school boards in the Calgary Catholic School District ban the distribution of the HPV vaccine.

He is a noted critic of modern trends in government, whether these be the libertarian policies of the Alberta Progressive Conservatives (Provincial Government), or the tendency of certain Canadian federal politicians to overlook their Catholic identities at election time.

Views

Same-sex marriage
On July 30, 2003, Henry commented on Canadian Prime Minister Jean Chrétien's support for the legalization of same-sex marriage: "I pray for the Prime Minister because I think his eternal salvation is in jeopardy. He is making a morally grave error and he's not being accountable to God... He doesn't understand what it means to be a good Catholic."

Abortion
After Joe Clark, former Tory leader and a Catholic, described himself as pro-choice, Henry described his comments as "scandalous".

HPV vaccine and promiscuity
Henry does not allow public health officials to vaccinate students in Catholic schools against human papillomavirus, or HPV. He believes that the HPV vaccine is a partial prophylaxis which is utilized instead of, rather than with, the development of self-discipline and virtue.

Quotes
 "If one happens to be a Catholic, there cannot be a split between one's internal kind of views and thoughts ... and what one says publicly. One has a duty, whether he likes it or not, to preach the word of God. This is part of the very mission of the Church, which is not confined to guys like myself who wear this funny Roman collar...."

See also

References

External links

Roman Catholic Diocese of Calgary (official page)
Bishop may ban Clark
Calgary bishop wants government to oppose gays
Porn channel an abomination, opinion column by Fred Henry

1943 births
Living people
21st-century Roman Catholic bishops in Canada
University of Notre Dame alumni
St. Peter's Seminary (Diocese of London, Ontario) alumni
20th-century Roman Catholic bishops in Canada
Roman Catholic bishops of Calgary